The Inaugural 1996 Royal Bank Cup is the 26th Junior "A" 1996 ice hockey National Championship for the Canadian Junior A Hockey League.

The Royal Bank Cup was competed for by the winners of the Doyle Cup, Anavet Cup, Dudley Hewitt Cup, the Fred Page Cup and a host city.

The tournament was hosted by the Melfort Mustangs and Melfort, Saskatchewan.

The Playoffs

Round Robin

Results
Melfort Mustangs defeat Yorkton Terriers 7-1
Newmarket 87's defeat Vernon Vipers 7-5
Melfort Mustangs defeat Moncton Beavers 5-0
Newmarket 87's defeat Yorkton Terriers 5-2
Vernon Vipers defeat Moncton Beavers 6-3
Melfort Mustangs defeat Vernon Vipers 5-1
Yorkton Terriers defeat Moncton Beavers 8-2
Melfort Mustangs defeat Newmarket 87's 11-3
Moncton Beavers defeat Newmarket 87's 4-3
Vernon Vipers defeat Yorkton Terriers 5-1

Semi-finals and Final

Awards
Most Valuable Player: Serge Bourgeois (Moncton Beavers)
Top Scorer: Jason Duda (Melfort Mustangs)
Most Sportsmanlike Player: Valeri Ermolov (Melfort Mustangs)
Top Goalie: Joel Laing (Melfort Mustangs)
Top Forward: Jeff Cheeseman (Vernon Vipers)
Top Defenceman: Curtis Doell (Melfort Mustangs)

Roll of League Champions
AJHL: St. Albert Saints
BCHL: Vernon Vipers
CJHL: Cornwall Colts
MJHL: St. James Canadians
MJAHL: Dartmouth Oland Exports
NOJHL: Rayside-Balfour Sabrecats
OPJHL: Newmarket 87's
QPJHL: Contrecoeur Eperviers
RMJHL: Prince George Spruce Kings
SJHL: Melfort Mustangs

See also
Canadian Junior A Hockey League
Royal Bank Cup
Anavet Cup
Doyle Cup
Dudley Hewitt Cup
Fred Page Cup
Abbott Cup
Mowat Cup

External links
Royal Bank Cup Website

1996
Cup
1996
Royal Bank